Laihka State, also spelt Legya or Lecha, was a state in the central division of the Southern Shan States of Burma, with an area of .

The general character of the state was hilly and broken, with a mean altitude of a little under . The main rivers were the Nam Teng, an important tributary of the Salween, and the Nam Pawn. Laihka, located in the plain of the Nam Teng, was the capital where the saopha had his palace (haw). The town of Panglong, where the Panglong Agreement took place, is located close to Laihka.

History
Traditional legends talk about a predecessor kingdom in the area named Hansavadi.
Laihka State was founded in 1505 as a state subordinated to Hsenwi State.
On the downfall of King Thibaw civil war broke out, and reduced the population to a few hundred. In 1901 it had risen again to 25,811. About seven-ninths of the land under cultivation consisted of wet rice cultivation. A certain amount of upland rice was also cultivated, and cotton, sugarcane and garden produce made up the rest. Laihka, the capital, was noted for its ironwork, both the iron and the implements made being produced at Pang Long in the west of the state. This and lacquerware were the chief exports, as also a considerable amount of pottery. The imports were chiefly cotton piece-goods and salt.

Rulers
The rulers bore the title Myosa until mid nineteenth century.

Myosas

1734 - 1794                Khun Lek
1794 - 1803                Law Na 
1803 - 1807                La Hkam 
1807 - 18..                Hkun Lek

Saophas
The ritual style was Kambawsa Rahta Mahawunths Thiri Thudamaraza. The saopha start at 1505 the first Sao Khrua Hpa and in 1542 the linege of him is vacant Sao Hkun Möng the saopha of Hsipaw send his son Hkun Naw to be the saopha here 

Saophas:

 1505–1542 Sao Khrua Hpa
 1542–1579 Hso Naw Hpa
 1579–1609 Hso Kloung Hpa
 1609–1628 Hso Hon Hpa
 1628–1650 Hso Sieng Hpa
 1650–1670 Sao San Hpa
 1670–1687 Ngok Shin Hpa
 1687–1702 Pong Awk Phyu
 1702–1715 Sao Hkam Pan
 1715–1745 Sao Perng Long
 1745–1771 Sao Tern Möng
 1771–1794 Sao Sai Hkam
 1794–1803 Hkun Law Hpa
 1803–1807 Sao Hla Hkam
 1807–1854 Hkun Lek Hpa
 1854–1856 Hkun Aung Hkam (Shwe Taung Kyaw)
 1856–1860 Hkun Long Kyit Hpa
 1860–1862 Sao Hkam Möng (1st time)
 1862–1866 Hkun Hkwang Hpa
 1866–1868 Sao Nang Kyam Faung .... (female)
 1868–1879 Sao Hkam Möng (2nd time)
 1879–1882 Vacant
 1882–1928 Hkun Lai
 1928–1952 Sao Num

References

External links
"Gazetteer of Upper Burma and the Shan states"

Shan States
1505 establishments in Asia